The 1949 Bowling Green Falcons football team was an American football team that represented Bowling Green State University as an independent during the 1949 college football season. The team was led by ninth-year head coach Robert Whittaker. The Falcons compiled a 4–5 record and outscored their opponents 206 to 161.

Schedule

References

Bowling Green
Bowling Green Falcons football seasons
Bowling Green Falcons football